Mays is an unincorporated community in Center Township, Rush County, in the U.S. state of Indiana.

History
A post office has been in operation at Mays since 1883. Mays was laid out and platted in 1884.

Geography
It lies east of the town of Carthage, and west of the unincorporated community Raleigh.

Education
Mays is served by Mays Community Academy for grades K-6, and they move to Benjamin Rush Middle School in Rushville for grades 7–8, and then Rushville Consolidated High School in grades 9–12.

References

Unincorporated communities in Rush County, Indiana
Unincorporated communities in Indiana